Sekolah Bogor Raya (SBR) is an International school for students in Pre-Kindergarten (age 3) through Grade 12 incorporated under the laws of the Republic of Indonesia as a non-profit organization. It is in the town of Bogor, West Java. SBR was founded in 1995 by the Danasha Foundation to provide English language education to the children of expatriates and Indonesians. SBR is affiliated with the Association of National Plus Schools (ANPS).

Sekolah Bogor Raya is a multi-faith school with students from many nationalities and backgrounds. The students come mostly from the Bogor, Sentul, and Cibubur areas.

Curriculum 
Sekolah Bogor Raya provides the International Baccalaureate Organization (IBO) Primary Years Program (PYP) at the primary level. This leads on to the IGCSE program which is then followed by the GAC program for university entrance at the Senior High School level.

History 
Sekolah Bogor Raya was founded in 1995 by Douglas Stoltz. As of 2011, Sekolah Bogor Raya had over 550 students. On 2016 they built a new building for the SMP and SMA students.

Accreditation
The school maintains national and international accreditations.

 ANPS (Association of National Plus School) accredited - A Rating
IBO (International Baccalaureate Organization) PYP (Primary Years Program) authorized
 GAC (Global Assessment Certificate) accredited
 CIE (University of Cambridge International Examinations) for IGCSE and A-Level

References

External links 
Sekolah Bogor Raya website

National Plus schools
Bogor
Education in West Java
Educational institutions established in 1995
Non-profit organizations based in Indonesia
Cambridge schools in Indonesia
International Baccalaureate schools in Indonesia
Schools in Indonesia
1995 establishments in Indonesia